Fragment of Fear is a 1970 British thriller film directed by Richard C. Sarafian and starring David Hemmings, Gayle Hunnicutt, Wilfrid Hyde-White, Roland Culver, Flora Robson and Arthur Lowe. It was adapted from the 1965 novel A Fragment of Fear by John Bingham.

Plot
Tim Brett (Hemmings) is visiting his rich but estranged aunt (Flora Robson) in an Italian coastal hotel catering mainly for old ladies.

On a tour of Pompeii visitors find the body of his aunt - who has been strangled. An elaborate funeral follows. At the funeral Tim has a conversation with Signor Bardoni, the hotel owner, who organised the funeral. He says it is ironic that his aunt has been killed by a criminal when she had spent her life "helping criminals". A card on a wreath at the funeral says it is from "The Stepping Stones".

He is a former drug addict who has written a book about his experience and has been published. He has been clean for about a year. He had recently become acquainted with his aunt (Robson), a philanthropist who expresses interest in helping some of Tim's former acquaintances. She is found murdered soon after. Tim starts a relationship with Juliet (Hunnicutt), the woman who found his aunt's body, and they are soon engaged.

Dissatisfied with the progress that the police are making in his aunt's murder case, he begins to ask questions of some of his aunt's acquaintances. He then begins to receive warnings from unknown persons to stop his inquiries. On the train he meets an elderly woman (Wimbush). She hands him a note of supposed comfort, asking him to read it at home. The note turns out to be a warning about leaving matters to the police, apparently typed on his own typewriter. There's also an ominous laugh recorded on Tim's own tape recorder, indicating that someone had been in his apartment.

Tim is then visited by a police sergeant, Sgt. Matthews (Newark), who informs him that the woman on the train had lodged a complaint against Tim. Sgt. Matthews takes Tim's information but after the woman is also killed, Tim finds out that there is no sergeant by that name working at the police station. Tim is later assaulted on the streets at night by two men who leave him lying on the ground with a hypodermic needle. Tim throws the needle away down a gutter. He makes contact with a secret government agency which tells him that they are after the people who are threatening him, but all is - again - not what it seems to be. As the situation continues, Tim and Juliet's wedding fast approaches.

Cast
 David Hemmings as Tim Brett
 Gayle Hunnicutt as Juliet Bristow
 Wilfrid Hyde-White as Mr. Copsey
 Flora Robson as Lucy Dawson
 Adolfo Celi as Signor Bardoni
 Roland Culver as Mr. Vellacot
 Daniel Massey as Major Ricketts
 Mona Washbourne as Mrs. Gray
 Arthur Lowe as Mr. Nugent
 Yootha Joyce as Miss Ward-Cadbury
 Derek Newark as Sergeant Matthews
 Patricia Hayes as Mrs. Baird
 Mary Wimbush as "Bunface"
 Glynn Edwards as CID Superintendent
 Philip Stone as CID Sergeant
 Bernard Archard as Priest
 Kenneth Cranham as Joe
 Angelo Infanti as Bruno
 Massimo Sarchielli as Mario
 Michael Rothwell as Rocky
 Petra Markham as Schoolgirl 
 Georgina Moon as Schoolgirl
 Lois Hyett as Schoolgirl 
 John Rae as Uncle Stanley 
 Edward Kemp as Kenny 
 Hilda Barry as Miss Daley
 Kurt Christian as Nino 
 Jessica Dublin as American Matron 
 Louise Lambert as American Matron 
 Richard Kerr as Pop Singer 
 A London Pigeon as Columbus

Production

Filming
It was made at Shepperton Studios. Location shooting took place around London, Seaford in Sussex and around Pompeii and Sorrento in Italy.  The film's sets were designed by the art director Ray Simm. Costumes were by Phyllis Dalton.

Music
The wild British jazz score composed by Johnny Harris was later used by Levi's to soundtrack their European Kung Fu TV advertising campaign in the late 1990s. The original soundtrack notably features Harold McNair on solo flute.

References

External links

1970 films
1970s mystery thriller films
1970s psychological thriller films
British mystery thriller films
British psychological thriller films
Films with screenplays by Paul Dehn
Films about writers
Films based on British novels
Columbia Pictures films
Films shot at Shepperton Studios
Films shot in London
Films set in London
Films set in Italy
Films directed by Richard C. Sarafian
1970s English-language films
1970s British films